Treptoplatypus solidus, is a species of weevil found in Asia and Australia.

Description
Body length is about 0.20 mm. Female with pitted area almost V-shaped in outline. There are about 50 pits. The inner process of the pit is slender and small. Male is without any integumentary pits in pronotum. Forecoxal and mesocoxal cavities are mycetangium-shaped.

References 

Curculionidae
Insects of Sri Lanka
Insects described in 1859